Imeni Karla Libknekhta is an urban locality (a work settlement) in Kurchatovsky District of Kursk Oblast, Russia, located on the left bank of the Seym River.  Population:

History

The village of Peny was settled four hundred years ago on the banks of the Penk River.  In 1930, it was granted urban-type settlement status and named after Karl Liebknecht, a German Communist.

Economy
There is a sugar mill, a machine-building factory, a railway station and an important railway line linking Kursk with Ukraine.

References

Urban-type settlements in Kursk Oblast